Mansfield Lahm Regional Airport  is three miles (5 km) north of Mansfield, in Richland County, Ohio. By car the airport is an hour away from Cleveland and Columbus, near Interstate I-71, US Rt 30, State Route 13.

Facilities
It has one helipad, 24 x 24 ft (7 x 7 m) asphalt.
The airport adjoins several industrial parks.

Richland Aviation provides services as a Fixed-Base Operator.
U-Vary Aire provides flight instruction.
Spectra Jet, Inc provides aircraft maintenance

The airport is home to the Mansfield Lahm Air National Guard Base and the 179th Airlift Wing (179 AW), an Ohio Air National Guard unit operationally-gained by the Air Mobility Command (AMC).  The unit has about 1000 personnel, of which about 300 are full-time Active Guard and Reserve (AGR) and Air Reserve Technician (ART) personnel and the remaining 760 are traditional part-time air national guardsmen.  The wing has been active at Mansfield Lahm since its establishment in 1948, operating various fighter aircraft until 1976 when it transitioned to an airlift mission with C-130 Hercules aircraft.  The wing has performed service during Operations Desert Shield, Desert Storm, Southern Watch, Noble Eagle, Enduring Freedom and Iraqi Freedom.  Retiring their C-130's in 2009, the 179th flew the C-27 Spartan until 2013, at which time it began transitioning back to the C-130.

The airport can handle large aircraft including the USAF C-5 and the Antonov 124-100.

In 2011 the airport had 19,345 aircraft operations, average 53 per day: 51% transient general aviation, 3% air taxi, 26% military and <1% airline. 72 aircraft are based at this airport: 78% single-engine, 15% multi-engine, 1% jet and 6% military.

Commercial Air Service
No scheduled airlines, but charter services are available. The first airline flights were TWA DC-3s in 1947; Lake Central replaced TWA in 1953, and successor Allegheny served Mansfield until 1969 when Allegheny Commuter took over.

Events
Each year the airport hosts Mansfield Airport Day: aircraft tours, fly-ins, airplane and helicopter rides, as well as food, historical lectures, various exhibits/vendors, kid’s activities area, and a car show.

Incidents and accidents
 On 1 July 2004 a Zenith STOL CH 701, registered N98EH, failed to maintain directional control during a precautionary landing. The aircraft suffered a loss of oil pressure and partial loss of engine power, due to unapproved maintenance modification. One injury was reported.

References

External links 
Mansfield Lahm Airport at City of Mansfield website

Airports in Ohio
Mansfield, Ohio
Buildings and structures in Richland County, Ohio
Transportation in Richland County, Ohio